Arnold is an unincorporated community in Ness County, Kansas, United States.  It lies along K-4, north-northwest of the city of Ness City.

History
Arnold was a station and shipping point on the Missouri Pacific Railroad.

The first post office in Arnold was established in about 1902. It was discontinued in 2006.

Geography
Its elevation is 2,566 feet (782 m), and it is located at  (38.6402921, -100.0462373).

Education
The community is served by Western Plains USD 106 public school district.  The Western Plains High School mascot is Bobcats.

Arnold became a part of the Ransom school district in 1960. The Arnold School closed in 1969. USD 106 formed in 2004 by the consolidation of Ransom USD 302 and Bazine USD 304.

References

Further reading

External links
 Communities in Ness County
 Ness County maps: Current, Historic, KDOT

Unincorporated communities in Ness County, Kansas
Unincorporated communities in Kansas